The 2019–20 Brose Bamberg season is the 65th season in the existence of the club. The club will play in the Basketball Bundesliga (BBL) and BBL-Pokal, as well as in Europe in the Basketball Champions League.

On 20 June 2019, Bamberg announced that Roel Moors had signed a two-year contract to become the club's new head coach.

Players

Squad information

Depth chart

Transactions

In 

|}

Out

|}

Pre-season
Brose Bamberg began its pre-season on 21 August 2019.

References

External links
 Official website

Bamberg
Bamberg